The Grand Master of the Teutonic Order is the supreme head of the Teutonic Order. It is equivalent to the grand master of other military orders and the superior general in non-military Roman Catholic religious orders. Hochmeister, literally "high master", is only used in reference to the Teutonic Order, as Großmeister ("grand master") is used in German to refer to the leaders of other orders of knighthood.

An early version of the full title in Latin was Magister Hospitalis Sanctae Mariae Alemannorum Hierosolymitani. Since 1216, the full title Magister Hospitalis Domus Sanctae Mariae Teutonicorum Hierosolymitani ("Master of the Hospital House of the Blessed Virgin Mary of the Germans of Jerusalem") was used.

The offices of Hochmeister  and Deutschmeister (Magister Germaniae) were united in 1525. The title of Magister Germaniae had been introduced in 1219 as the head of the bailiwicks in the Holy Roman Empire, from 1381 also those in Italy, raised to the rank of a prince of the Holy Roman Empire in 1494, but merged with the office of grand master under Walter von Cronberg in 1525, from which time the head of the order had the title of Hoch- und Deutschmeister. From 1466 to 1525, the Grand Masters of the Teutonic Order were vassals and princes of the Polish Crown.

Coat of arms

The coat of arms representing the grand master (Deutschmeisterwappen) is shown with a golden cross fleury or cross potent superimposed on the black cross, with the imperial eagle as a central inescutcheon.
The golden cross potent overlaid on the black cross becomes widely used by the 14th century, developing into a golden cross fleury by the 15th century.
A legendary account attributes the introduction of the cross potent to John of Brienne, King of Jerusalem, who granted the master of the order this cross as a variation of the Jerusalem cross, while the fleur-de-lis was supposedly granted on  20 August 1250 by Louis IX of France. While this legendary account cannot be traced back further than the early modern period (Christoph Hartknoch, 1684) there is some evidence that the design does indeed date to the mid 13th century.

Before the Reformation
Compared to other medieval governments, transfer of power within the Teutonic Knights was run efficiently. Upon the death of a grand master, the vice master called a capitulum composed of the leading officers of the order. The general chapter would select a twelve-person electoral college composed of seven knights, four sergeants, and one priest. Once a majority-candidate for grand master was chosen, the minority electors would concede to support unanimity. These elections usually provided a succeeding grand master within three months.

Candidates for the position of grand master had experience as senior administrators for the order and were usually chosen on merit, not lineage. This changed only after the order had entered a steady decline, with the selection of Frederick of Saxony and Albert of Brandenburg-Ansbach, members of the powerful Wettin and House of Hohenzollern dynasties.

When the Teutonic Knights were originally based in Acre in Outremer, the grand masters spent much of their time at the papal and imperial courts. The grand masters were most powerful after the order's 13th century conquest of Prussia during the Northern Crusades and the creation of the militarized State of the Teutonic Order, which lasted until 1525 (from 1466 to 1525 as part of the Kingdom of Poland as a fief). After the order's capital moved from Venice to Malbork (Marienburg) in 1309, the grand master's power was at its height. He had ultimate control over Prussia, which gave him command over the Prussian commanders. When the general chapter would meet in Elbląg (Elbing), he was able to use this influence to ratify administrative measures he proposed. The grand master also served as the castellan of Marienburg and was aided by the order's treasurer. He was also a member of the Hanseatic League, allowing him to receive some of the league's custom dues.

Excavations in the church of Kwidzyn (Marienwerder) performed in 2007 yielded the skeletal remains of three Grand Masters of the late medieval period, Werner von Orseln (1324–30), Ludolf König von Wattzau (1342–45) and Heinrich von Plauen (1410–13). The church had been known as the burial place of the bishops of Pomesania, but the discovery of the grand masters' burials was unexpected. The bodies had been buried in gold-painted wooden coffins draped in silk robes.

Since the 1466 Second Peace of Toruń, the Grand Masters of the Teutonic Order were vassals of the Kingdom of Poland, and every Grand Master of the Teutonic Order was obliged to swear an oath of allegiance to the reigning Polish king within six months of taking office. The Grand Masters were also princes and counselors of the Polish kings and the Kingdom of Poland. The State of the Teutonic Order was a part of Poland as a fief.

Leaders of the early Brotherhood, 1190–1198 
The Teutonic Order as a hospice brotherhood in Outremer:

Grand Masters of the Order, 1198–1525 

The Teutonic Order as a spiritual military order had a total of 37 grand masters between 1198 and 1525.

Several armorials of the 15th and early 16th century depict the coat of arms of the grand masters. These include the Chronica by Ulrich Richenthal, an armorial of St. Gallen kept in Nuremberg, an armorial of southwest Germany kept in Leipzig and the Miltenberg armorial. Conspicuously absent from these lists are three grand masters, Gerhards von Malberg (1241–1244) and his successors Heinrich von Hohenlohe (1244–1249) and Gunther von Wüllersleben (1250–1252), so that pre-modern historiographical tradition has a list of 34 grand masters for the time before 1525 (as opposed to 37 in modern accounts).

1. 1198–sometime before 1208 Heinrich Walpot von Bassenheim
2. documented for 1208 Otto von Kerpen
3. 1208–1209 Heinrich von Tunna
4. 1209–1239 Hermann von Salza. As a friend and councillor of emperor Frederick II, Hermann achieved the recognition of the order as of equal status with the older military orders of the Knights Hospitaller and the Knights Templar by Pope Honorius III. In 1237, he also oversaw the incorporation of the Livonian Brothers of the Sword into the Teutonic order.
5. 1239–1240 Konrad von Thüringen
  (6.) 1240–1244 Gerhard von Malberg
  (7.) 1244–1249 Heinrich von Hohenlohe
  (8.) 1249–1252 
6. (9.) 1252–1256 Poppo von Osterna (the pretender Wilhelm von Urenbach (1253–1256) was chosen in opposition to Poppo von Osterna).
7. (10.) 1256–1273 Anno von Sangershausen
8. (11.) 1273–1282 Hartmann von Heldrungen
9. (12.) 1282 or 1283 –1290 Burchard von Schwanden
10. (13.) 1290–1297 Konrad von Feuchtwangen. After the fall of Acre, Konrad moved the Order's headquarters to Venice.
11. (14.) 1297–1303 Gottfried von Hohenlohe
12. (15.) 1303–1311 Siegfried von Feuchtwangen, of the same family as his predecessor Konrad von Feuchtwangen. Siegfried moved the order's headquarters to Prussia in 1309.
13. (16.) 1311–1324 Karl von Trier
14. (17.) 1324–1330 Werner von Orseln
15. (18.) 1331–1335 Luther von Braunschweig (Lothar)
16. (19.) 1335–1341 Dietrich von Altenburg
17. (20.) 1342–1345 Ludolf König von Wattzau
18. (21.) 1345–1351 Heinrich Dusemer
19. (22.) 1351–1382 Winrich von Kniprode
20. (23.) 1382–1390 Konrad Zöllner von Rotenstein
21. (24.) 1391–1393 Konrad von Wallenrode
22. (25.) 1393–1407 Konrad von Jungingen
23. (26.) 1407–1410 Ulrich von Jungingen
24. (27.) 1410–1413 Heinrich von Plauen
25. (28.) 1414–1422 Michael Küchmeister von Sternberg
26. (29.) 1422–1441 Paul von Rusdorf
27. (30.) 1441–1449 Konrad von Erlichshausen
28. (31.) 1449 or 1450–1467 Ludwig von Erlichshausen
29. (32.) 1467–1470 Heinrich Reuß von Plauen
30. (33.) 1470–1477 Heinrich Reffle von Richtenberg
31. (34.) 1477–1489 Martin Truchseß von Wetzhausen
32. (35.) 1489–1497 Johann von Tiefen
33. (36.) 1497–1510 Frederick, Duke of Saxony
34. (37.) 1510–1525 Albert of Brandenburg-Ansbach

After the Reformation

The last Hochmeister, Albert of Brandenburg-Ansbach, converted to Lutheranism and, with the consent of his overlord and uncle, King Sigismund I of Poland, turned the State of the Teutonic Order into the secular Duchy of Prussia per the Treaty of Kraków, which was sealed by the Prussian Homage in Kraków in 1525. The commanderies in the autonomous Livonian Terra Mariana likewise were lost by 1561, as that region also became Protestant. However, the Order retained its bailiwicks in the Holy Roman Empire (Germany and Italy), which had been administered by the Deutschmeister since 1219.

As the Order was now limited to its possessions in the German kingdom, incumbent Deutschmeister Walter von Cronberg was also appointed Hochmeister by Emperor Charles V in 1527. The administrative seat was moved to Mergentheim Castle in Franconia. The Hoch- und Deutschmeister was ranked as one of the ecclesiastical Princes of the Holy Roman Empire until 1806; when Mergentheim fell to the newly established Kingdom of Württemberg, their residence was relocated to the Deutschordenshaus in Vienna. The dual title lasted until in 1923, when the last secular Grand Master, Archduke Eugen of Austria, resigned from office.

A Franconian  of the Imperial Army was formed under Count Palatine Francis Louis of Neuburg in 1696; organized as 4th Infantry Regiment in 1769 and deployed at Vienna, it was known as the Lower Austrian Hoch- und Deutschmeister regiment from 1814.

Hoch- und Deutschmeister, 1527–1929 
 1527–1543 Walter von Cronberg
 1543–1566 Wolfgang Schutzbar
 1566–1572 Georg Hund von Wenkheim
 1572–1590 Heinrich von Bobenhausen
 1590–1618 Maximilian III, Archduke of Austria
 1619–1624 Charles of Austria, Bishop of Wroclaw
 1625–1627 Johann Eustach von Westernach
 1627–1641 Johann Kaspar von Stadion
 1641–1662 Archduke Leopold Wilhelm of Austria
 1662–1664 Archduke Charles Joseph of Austria
 1664–1684 Johann Caspar von Ampringen
 1685–1694 Ludwig Anton von Pfalz-Neuburg
 1694–1732 Francis Louis of Palatinate-Neuburg
 1732–1761 Prince Clemens August of Bavaria
 1761–1780 Prince Charles Alexander of Lorraine
 1780–1801 Archduke Maximilian Francis of Austria
 1801–1804 Archduke Charles, Duke of Teschen
 1804–1835 Archduke Anton Victor of Austria (office becomes hereditary to the Imperial House of Austria)
 1835–1863 Archduke Maximilian of Austria-Este
 1863–1894 Archduke Wilhelm Franz of Austria
 1894–1923 Archduke Eugen of Austria (end of hereditary status)
 1923–1929 Norbert Klein (Bishop of Brno from 1916 until 1926)

1929–present 
Time of the Teutonic Order as a clerical Roman Catholic religious order
 1929–1933: Norbert Klein
 1933–1936: Paul Heider
 1936–1948: Robert Schälzky
 1948–1970: Marian Tumler
 1970–1988: Ildefons Pauler
 1988–2000: Arnold Wieland
 2000–2018: Bruno Platter
 2018–present: Frank Bayard

See also
 Grand master (order)
 List of grand masters of the Knights Hospitaller
 Grand Masters and Lieutenancies of the Order of the Holy Sepulchre
 Grand Masters of the Order of Saint Lazarus
 List of grand masters of the Knights Templar
 Mergentheim (History), a former residence

Notes

References 

 Arnold, Udo (ed.), Die Hochmeister des Deutschen Ordens 1190-1994. Quellen und Studien zur Geschichte des Deutschen Ordens 40 = Veröffentlichungen der Internationalen Historischen Kommission zur Erforschung des Deutschen Ordens 6. Marburg, 1998.
Borchert Friedrich, "Die Hochmeister des Deutschen Ordens in Preußen." In: Preußische Allgemeine Zeitung, 6 October 2001.

Urban, William, The Teutonic Knights: A Military History. Greenhill Books. London, 2003. .

External links

 
Teutonic